Matter of Trust is a 1997 independent erotic thriller film directed by Joey Travolta and written by John Penney. Model and dancer Dita Von Teese played a small role. Other cast members include: C. Thomas Howell as Michael D'Angelo, Joan Severance as Theresa Marsh, Nick Mancuso as Peter Marsh, Robert Miano as Ben and Jennifer Leigh Warren as Janet.

Premise
A prosecutor is building a case against a suspected serial killer. She receives death threats, but ignores them at first. Until he husband disappears and someone blackmails her. She then turns to her ex-husband, a suspended homicide detective.

Cast
 C. Thomas Howell as Michael D'Angelo
 Joan Severance as Theresa Marsh
 Nick Mancuso as Peter Marsh
 Robert Miano as Ben
 Jennifer Leigh Warren as Janet
 Randee Heller as Stoddard
 Corbin Timbrook as Danzig
 John V. Barbieri as Sandblaster
 Eddie Ebell as Billt
 Natasha Espledra as Heather
 George Georgiadis as Santos
 Melissa Greenspan as Sara
 Claire Jacobs as Ivy
 Susie McDonnell as Kim
 Vincent Riotta as Johnny
 Harold Green as AA Spokesman 
 Dayna Danika as The Receptionist
 Sharone Carmi as Newscaster 
 Julia Verdin as Newscaster
 Dita Von Teese as Girl With C.T.

External links
 
 New York Times Movie Review

1997 films
American independent films
1990s American films